Hester Sophia Frances Grigson (born 19 June 1959) is an English cookery writer and celebrity cook. She has followed the same path and career as her mother, Jane Grigson. Her father was the poet and writer Geoffrey Grigson, and her half-brother was musician and educator Lionel Grigson.

Life
Grigson was born in the village of Broad Town, near Swindon, Wiltshire, in 1959 and attended Oxford High School. From there she went on to study mathematics at UMIST, Manchester. After graduating in 1982 with a Bachelor of Science degree in mathematics (she was Vice-President of the UMIST Alumni Association), she worked for a time as a production manager of pop videos for groups including Bonnie Tyler and the Style Council. Having inherited her mother's love of food, she found she also enjoyed writing about it. Her first food article, published in 1983 in the Sunday Express Magazine, was entitled "Fifty ways with potatoes". She has since written columns for publications including the Evening Standard (1986–93), the Sunday Times (1994–96) and The Independent (1997–98).

Grigson's television debut came in 1993 with the 16-part series Grow Your Greens, Eat Your Greens on Channel 4, which won the Caroline Walker Prize (Media Category). Her more recent television work includes Sophie Grigson in the Orient and Sophie Grigson in the Souk for Travel Channel.

She won the Guild of Food Writers Cookery Journalist of the Year Award in 2001 for her work in Country Living magazine. She is a keen supporter of organic and local food suppliers and is an advocate for decent children's food. She is a patron of the Children's food festival. 

Sophie's Cookery School, based in Oxford was the first dedicated pop-up cookery school in the country. She currently lives in Puglia in the south of Italy, where she runs a small catering company, Trulli Delicious.
 
She was previously married to William Black, with whom she had two children.

Bibliography

 Food For Friends (1987)  Ebury Press
 Sophie's Table (1990) Penguin Books
 Book of Parties (1990, contributor) Sainsbury
 Sophie Grigson’s  Ingredients Book  (1991, nominated for the James Beard Award)  Pyramid Books
 The Carved Angel Cookery Book (1992 with Joyce Molyneux)  Grafton
 Eat Your Greens (1993) BBC Books
 Travels à la Carte (1994, with William Black) BBC Books
 Students' Cookbook (1993) Sainsbury
 Sophie Grigson’s Meat (1995) BBC Books
 Oxfam Fairworld Cookbook (1997, contributing editor) Cassell
 Taste of the Times (1997) BBC Books
 Fish (1998, with William Black)  Headline
 Sophie Grigson's Herbs (1998) BBC Books
 Cooks For Kosovo (1999,  contributing editor) Headline
 Feasts for a Fiver (1999) BBC Books
 Sunshine Food (2000) BBC Books
 Organic (2001, with William Black) Headline
 Complete Sophie Grigson Cook Book (2001) BBC Books
 Sophie Grigson's Country Kitchen (2003) Headline
 The First-time Cook (2004, reissued as The Student Cookbook, 2010) Collins
 Vegetables (2006, reissued as The Vegetable Bible, 2009) Collins
 The Soup Book (2009 reissued 2019, Contributing Editor) DK
 Spices (2011), Quadrille
 My Kitchen Table (2012) BBC Books

References

External links
 Sophie’s Cookery School.
 Sophie Grigson page at Deborah McKenna Limited.
 There are food and wine tours with Sophie Grigson and 

 "Education: Passed/Failed: Sophie Grigson" (interview by Jonathan Sale), The Independent, 25 September 1997.
 "Food & Drink: The year of eating exotically: Sophie Grigson travelled the world in search of good taste and found the piece of cod that passeth all understanding", The Independent'', 24 December 1993.
 Sophie Grigson's recipes, Food – Chefs, BBC.

1959 births
Living people
People educated at Oxford High School, England
Alumni of the University of Manchester Institute of Science and Technology
English food writers
English television presenters
English chefs
Women food writers
Women cookbook writers
People from Wiltshire
The Independent people
The Sunday Times people